Stefan Stojanović (born 9 February 1997) is a Serbian professional footballer who plays as a goalkeeper for Greek Super League club Levadiakos.

Career

Napredak Kruševac
As a goalkeeper of Sloga Leskovac cadet team and a member of Serbia U17 national team, Stojanović joined Napredak Kruševac in summer 2013, signing a contract on 8 August same year. He spent 3 seasons with club youth categories, but was also licensed for the first team as a third choice. During the spring half of 2015–16, Stojanović was loaned to Temnić, where he played mostly matches in the Serbian League East, and also won the cup of Rasina District. He made his debut for the first team of Napredak Kruševac in the last fixture of the 2015–16 Serbian First League season. In summer 2016, Stojanović moved on six-month loan to Radnički Obrenovac. At the beginning of 2017, Stojanović terminated the contract with Napredak and left club as a free agent.

Career statistics

Honours
Napredak Kruševac
Serbian First League: 2015–16
Levadiakos
Super League 2: 2021–22

References

External links

1997 births
Living people
Association football goalkeepers
Serbian footballers
Serbian expatriate footballers
FK Napredak Kruševac players
FK Temnić players
FK Radnički Obrenovac players
FK Jagodina players
FK Trayal Kruševac players
FK Radnički Pirot players
Levadiakos F.C. players
Serbian League players
Serbian First League players
Super League Greece 2 players
Super League Greece players
Serbian expatriate sportspeople in Greece
Expatriate footballers in Greece